Wah Gwaan?! is the twelfth studio album by Jamaican dancehall artist Shaggy. The album features guest appearances from Gene Noble, Alexander Stewart, and Noah Powa. The album was released on 10 May 2019.

Background
The first single from the album, "Use Me", was released on 21 November 2018.

The second single from the album, "You", featuring Canadian singer Alexander Stewart, was released on 29 March 2019.

Track listing

References

2019 albums
Shaggy (musician) albums